Arhopala ace, or Tytler's dull oakblue, is a species of butterfly belonging to the lycaenid family. It was described by Charles Lionel Augustus de Nicéville in 1893 and is found in Southeast Asia and Northeast India (Manipur, Burma, Thailand, Vietnam, Peninsular Malaya, Sumatra and Borneo).

Subspecies
Arhopala ace ace (Peninsular Malaya, Sumatra, Borneo)
Arhopala ace arata Tytler, 1915 (Manipur, Burma, Thailand, Vietnam)

References

External links
"Arhopala Boisduval, 1832" at Markku Savela's Lepidoptera and Some Other Life Forms. Retrieved June 6, 2017.

Arhopala
Butterflies described in 1893
Butterflies of Asia